Fanjove Island is a coral island in Songosongo ward in Kilwa District of Lindi Region in Tanzania's Indian ocean coast. The island is a geographically part of the Songosongo Islands archipelago which is composed of 22 reefs and 4 islands. The other three islands are Songo Songo, Nyuni Island and Okuza Island.  The is land is originally been uninhabited, thus it has been leased to a luxury hotelier by the Tanzanian government.

References

 Islands of Lindi Region
 Islands of Tanzania